Abishegapakkam is a panchayat village in Ariyankuppam Commune in the Union Territory of Puducherry, India. It is also a revenue village under Ariyankuppam Firka

Geography
Abishegapakkam is bordered by Pudukkadi Village, Tamil Nadu in the west, Villianur Commune in the north, Thavalakuppam and Singirikudi (Tamil Nadu) in the east and Thimma Nayakan Palayam in the south

Demographics
Abishegapakkam has an average literacy rate of 81.49%.  The male literacy is 88.89%, the female literacy is 74.13%, and 10% of the population is under 6 years of age.

Road Network
Abishegapakkam is connected to Pondicherry by Thavalakuppam–Embalam State Highway (RC-20). It is also connected to Villianur by the Abishegapakkam-Uruvaiyaru road.

Tourism

Singirikudi Lakshminarashimhar Koil
Singirikudi Lakshminarashimhar Koil is located at 0.2 km from Abishegapakkam.  Singirikudi is famous for the Ugira Narashimhar.  Abishegapakkam is the main access point to reach this temple.

Politics
Abishegapakkam is a part of Manavely (State Assembly Constituency) which comes under Puducherry (Lok Sabha constituency).

References

External links
 Official website of the Government of the Union Territory of Puducherry

Villages in Puducherry district
Ariyankuppam